The 20th Alberta Legislative Assembly was in session from March 10, 1983, to April 10, 1986, with the membership of the assembly determined by the results of the 1982 Alberta general election held on November 2, 1982. The Legislature officially resumed on March 10, 1983, and continued until the fourth session was prorogued and dissolved on April 10, 1986, prior to the 1986 Alberta general election on May 8, 1986.

Alberta's twentieth government was controlled by the majority Progressive Conservative Association of Alberta for the fourth time, led by Premier Peter Lougheed until his resignation, he was replaced by Don Getty. The Official Opposition was led by Grant Notley of the New Democratic Party until his death on October 19, 1984, and later Ray Martin.  The Speaker was Gerard Amerongen who would serve in the role until he was defeated in the 1986 Alberta general election.

Party standings after the 20th General Election

 A party requires four seats to have official party status in the legislature. Parties with fewer than four seats are not entitled to party funding although their members will usually be permitted to sit together in the chamber.

Members elected
For complete electoral history, see individual districts.

References

Further reading

External links
Alberta Legislative Assembly
Legislative Assembly of Alberta Members Book
By-elections 1905 to present

20